Love on the Rocks may refer to:
"Love on the Rocks" (Neil Diamond song), 1980, from The Jazz Singer soundtrack
"Love on the Rocks", a song by Sara Bareilles from her 2007 album Little Voice
"Love on the Rocks with No Ice", a song by The Darkness from Permission to Land
"Love on the Rocks", a song by Poison from their 1988 album Open Up and Say... Ahh!
Love on the Rocks (film), a 2004 film starring Louis Koo
Love on the Rock, an upcoming American film by Matt Shapira
Love on the Rocks (album), a 1963 Julie London album
"Love on the Rocks", a season seven episode of the television series Full House
"Love on the Rocks", a season five episode of the TV series Hercules: The Legendary Journeys